"Star Light, Star Bright" is a science fiction short story by American writer Alfred Bester, first published in 1953.

Plot summary 

Marion Perkin Warbeck, referred to as "the doomed man", has discovered children with supernatural powers, which he calls "genius".  He is pursuing one Stuart Buchanan, a ten-year-old boy who he believes can lead him to these children.  Warbeck is a school principal who read an essay by Stuart that describes his friends inventing gadgets beyond known science.  When Warbeck attempted to find Stuart, not only had the boy disappeared but all records about him had vanished, and nobody who was closely involved with him remembered anything about him.

Warbeck tries to solve the mystery by going door to door in Stuart's old neighborhood, talking to people named "Buchanan" under various pretexts to avoid drawing attention to himself.  He is waylaid by a gang that runs a fraud on people with that name, and has to explain his reasons to them to save his life.  Once they understand that there might be a fortune to be made, they employ their own methods to track Stuart's family's sudden move to Brooklyn.  However, as the gang conduct a search they disappear one by one.  Warbeck is left calling Stuart's name in the street.  Unknown to him, Stuart is participating in a game of hide-and-seek nearby.  Hearing his name, he uses his "genius" to stay hidden.

Warbeck finds himself trapped on a "road cleaving infinitely through blackness".  The boy wished to be left alone, and formally wished so with the "Star Light, Star Bright" nursery rhyme.  The story closes by stating that Stuart unknowingly has a genius "for wishing".

The story describes a fraud known as the "Heirs of Buchanan", in which confidence tricksters approach people with the name "Buchanan" and offer them, for a fee, a chance to participate in the legacy of President James Buchanan, who is often believed to have died without leaving a will.

References to real events 
The Buchanan scam may be a fictionalized version of a fraud from the 1930s when families all over the country tried to participate in the supposed estate of one William Buchanan, who was believed to have owned valuable real estate in on which 99-year leases were about to expire. The fraud was described in Reader's Digest for November 1935.

Publication history

"Star Light, Star Bright" was first published in the July 1953 issue of The Magazine of Fantasy and Science Fiction.  It was later included in several anthologies and Bester short story collections, including:
 Starburst, 1958
 Star Light, Star Bright: The Short Fiction of Alfred Bester, Volume 2, 1976
 Virtual Unrealities, 1997

Sources

References

1953 short stories
Short stories by Alfred Bester
Works originally published in The Magazine of Fantasy & Science Fiction